Sam Davis (born 11 November 1998) is a professional rugby league footballer who plays as a  for the London Broncos in the Betfred Championship.

He has previously played for London in the Championship and the Super League, and spent time on loan from the Broncos at the Coventry Bears in League 1. Davis has also previously played for the York City Knights in the RFL Championship and spent time on loan at the London Broncos in the second tier.

Background
He is the younger brother of Matt Davis who last played for the Warrington Wolves in the Super League.

Career

London Broncos
In 2018 Davis made his professional debut for the London Broncos against the Barrow Raiders in the Betfred Championship.

York City Knights
On 14 Oct 2021 it was reported that he had signed for the York City Knights in the RFL Championship

References

External links

London Broncos profile
SL profile
York City Knights profile

1998 births
Living people
Coventry Bears players
English rugby league players
London Broncos players
Rugby league hookers
Rugby league players from Leicestershire
York City Knights players